Cui Jinming (born July 11, 1992) is a Chinese professional basketball player.

Career 
Cui is a basketball player for the Jilin Northeast Tigers of the Chinese Basketball Association.

Cui represented China's national basketball team at the 2016 FIBA Asia Challenge in Tehran, Iran.

References

External links
FIBA Profile
Asia-basket.com Profile

1992 births
Living people
Basketball players from Changchun
Jilin Northeast Tigers players
Point guards
Shooting guards
Chinese men's basketball players